Pasupatiswarar Temple is located in Pandanallur in the Thiruvidaimarudur taluk of Thanjavur district in the South Indian state of Tamil Nadu. Shiva is worshiped as Pasupatheeswarar, and is represented by the lingam and his consort Parvati is depicted as Mangalambika. The presiding deity is revered in the 7th century Tamil Saiva canonical work, the Tevaram, written by Tamil poet saints known as the nayanars and classified as Paadal Petra Sthalam.

This temple is associated with Parvathi playing with a ball, giving the name Pandanainallur to the village and subsequently worshipped the presiding deity in the form of a cow, giving the name Pasupatheeswarar to the presiding deity. There are many inscriptions associated with the temple indicating contributions from Cholas. The oldest parts of the present masonry structure were built during the Chola dynasty during the 11th century, while later expansions, are attributed to later periods.

The temple houses a three-tiered gateway tower known as gopuram. The temple has numerous shrines, with those of Pasupatheeswarar, Mangalambiga and Adikesava Perumal being the most prominent. The temple complex houses many halls and three precincts. The temple has four daily rituals at various times from 6:30 a.m. to 8 p.m., and five yearly festivals on its calendar. The Panguni Uthiram during the Tamil month of Panguni (April - May) and Masi Magam in Maasi (February - March) are the most prominent festivals celebrated in the temple. The temple is now maintained and administered by Hindu Religious and Charitable Endowments Department of the Government of Tamil Nadu.

Legend

As per Hindu legend, Parvathi, the consort of Shiva, was playing with a ball. As per another variant, she was playing a ball game with Lakshmi and Saraswati. Shiva collated the four vedas as a ball for his consort. To avoid interference, Parvathi disallowed sunset. This resulted in natural calamity leading to the fury of Shiva and kicked away the ball to obscurity. Shiva cursed Parvathi to become a cow and ordered her to worship him in the place where the ball was floated under Kondrai tree. Parvathi in the form of Kamadhenu, the holy cow worshipped the lord in snake's lair in Pandanallur.  Vishnu who herded the cow, found the cow devoid of milk one day and canned it. The cow was rescued by Shiva from the lair and Parvathi was freed off the curse. Some variants mention that sage Kanva was having the cow. It was milking an ant hill. When the sage followed the cow, it kicked the anthill under which an image of Linga was found. Following the legend, the image of the Lingam has a mark of hoof. The Lingam is white in colour and ablution is not performed for the presiding deity. The holy cow Kamadhenu milking on an anthill is a common legend associated with most Shiva temples named Pasupatheeswarar, namely the Eswarar worshipped by Pasu, the cow.

History
There are multiple inscriptions in the temple from the Cholas from the 10th century. The earliest inscription is recorded from the time of Rajaraja I. There are inscriptions from the subsequent kings like Vikrama Chola (1118-35), Rajadhiraja II (1166–1178), Kulothunga III (1178–1218) and Rajaraja III (1216–1256). There are inscriptions indicating donations to the temple from the Vijayanagar Empire. The inscriptions refer the presiding deity as Pasupathy Devan and Pasupatheeswarar, while the village is mentioned as Pandanainallur and Vadanattu Vilathurnattu Pandanallur.  In modern times, the temple is maintained and administered by the Hindu Religious and Charitable Endowments Department of the Government of Tamil Nadu. The temple has dance traditions specialising in Bharatanatyam.

Architecture
Pasupatheeswarar temple is located in Pandanallur, a village in the Tamil Nadu state highway SH150, on the Tirupanantal - Vaitheeswarankoil road, in the South Indian state of Tamil Nadu. The temple has a five-tiered rajagopuram, the entrance tower and all the shrines of the temple are enclosed in concentric rectangular granite walls. The temple has three prakarams (closed precincts of a temple) and many mandapams (halls). The temple faces east  and is entered via the rajagopuram (gateway tower). The presiding deity in the form of lingam is housed in the sanctum. Following the legend, the image of the Lingam has a mark of the cow's hoof. The Lingam is white in colour and ablution is not performed for the presiding deity. The attached hall, the ardhamandapa measures the same width as the sanctum, while its length is twice the sanctum. The ardhamandapa projects towards the east. The Mukhamandapa has a square structure. There are five devakoshtas that cover the exterior walls of the sanctum. The images of Dakshinamurthy and Brahma are the only ones remaining out of the five. The presiding deity of the temple is Pasupatheeswarar, housed in the sanctum. The consort Mangalambiga, is located in a south facing shrine. The temple has four bodies of water associated with it. The principal water tank is called Kamadhenu Theertham, which is located outside the main entrance of the temple.

Religious importance and Worship practices

The temple is counted as one of the temples built on the northern banks of River Kaveri. The temple is revered in the verses of Tevaram, the 7th century Saivite canonical work by the saint poet Sambandar. As the temple is revered in Tevaram, it is classified as Paadal Petra Sthalam, one of the 275 temples that find mention in the Saiva canon. 

The temple priests perform the puja (rituals) during festivals and on a daily basis. Like other Shiva temples of Tamil Nadu, the priests belong to the Shaiva community, a Brahmin sub-caste. The temple rituals are performed four times a day; Kalasanthi at 8:00 a.m., Uchikalam at 10:00 a.m., Sayarakshai at 5:00 p.m., and Ardha Jamam at 8:00 p.m. Each ritual comprises four steps: abhisheka (sacred bath), alangaram (decoration), naivethanam (food offering) and deepa aradanai (waving of lamps) for both Pasupatheeswarar and Mangalambikai. The worship is held amidst music with nagaswaram (pipe instrument) and tavil (percussion instrument), religious instructions in the Vedas (sacred texts) read by priests and prostration by worshippers in front of the temple mast.
The major festivals celebrated in the temple are Panguni Uthiram during the Tamil month of Panguni (April - May) and Masi Magam in Maasi (February - March).

References

External links 

Shiva temples in Thanjavur district
Padal Petra Stalam